The governor of Kalinga  is the chief executive of the provincial government of Kalinga.

Provincial Governors of Kalinga-Apayao (1966-1995)

Provincial Governors of Kalinga (1995-2025)

References

Governors of Kalinga (province)
Kalinga
1995 establishments in the Philippines